The Cult Information Centre (CIC) is a British anti-cult organisation that provides information and advice to members of what the organisation terms cults, as well as their affected family members, members of the press and scholarly researchers. The organisation also serves as a resource for information on controversial religious groups, therapy cults, and political cults. CIC gives educational talks about cults in schools around the United Kingdom to students about to start university education.

History 

The Cult Information Centre was founded in 1987 by Ian Haworth, who had previously been involved with the Council on Mind Abuse, and gained charitable status in the United Kingdom in 1992. Haworth later stated that CIC received complaints in Britain about the actions of Landmark Education, which he described as being linked to Werner Erhard's est movement. Haworth also made similar statements about the Werner Erhard and Associates course "The Forum".

Methodology 
The Cult Information Centre believes that the most striking features of post-war religious cults includes the usage of mind control techniques, and strict adherence to a leader or tight-knit leadership structure. This high level of adherence helps to reinforce authority, as well as belief in the leader's doctrine, which may involve his own personal delusions. The organisation cites twenty-six key forms of mind control, which includes hypnosis, peer pressure and groupthink, love bombing, the rejection of old values, confusing doctrine, use of subliminal messages, time-sense inhibition, dress codes, disinhibition, diet, confession, fear, and chanting and singing.

The organisation has attempted to define the term cult by analysing dictionary definitions, and psychological, religious, and secular definitions; however, it has found that they are all deficient in some manner. Its current definition of cult includes three main points: the group's identity was derived from a major religion, but its practices and belief system are dramatically different; its followers are not bound by a codified belief structure; and the group was founded by an individual who utilised fraudulent means to gain respect and acceptance. In his work Understanding New Religious Movements, John A. Saliba notes that though the organisation's definition of the term cult stems from a theological background, it incorporates sociological and psychological features as well.

The organisation believes that the number of cults actively recruiting from college campuses has increased, and says that intelligent students that are intellectually and/or spiritually curious are prime recruitment targets for cults. In addition to the susceptibility of college-age students and teenagers, CIC also believes that well-off professionals within the middle class are targeted by cults.

Reception and criticism
Some of the groups that the Cult Information Centre analyses have criticised their methods. John Campbell of the evangelical Christian group, the Jesus Army, insists they have good relations with other Christian churches, and called the Cult Information Centre "unethical" and its views "absolute nonsense". Following a BBC News article on Scientology which cited the Centre, the Church of Scientology said that its message had been misrepresented.

William Shaw contacted the Cult Information Centre in his 1993 investigation of cults, and was explicitly critical of its methods and the reliability of its research throughout his book. His opinion was that individuals had joined cults out of "their own hunger to believe" and is dismissive of "absurd scare stories".

A complaint was made in 2010 to the Charity Commission challenging the organisation's charitable status. The single complainant was never identified publicly. The complaint was not upheld and the organisation remains listed and regulated by the Charity Commission.

References 

Organizations established in 1987
Religious charities based in the United Kingdom
Anti-cult organizations